Simiskina is a genus of butterflies in the family Lycaenidae. The genus was erected by William Lucas Distant in 1886. The species of this genus are found in the Indomalayan realm.

Species
Simiskina pasira (Moulton, 1911)
Simiskina pavonica de Nicéville, 1895
Simiskina pediada (Hewitson, 1877)
Simiskina phalena (Hewitson, 1874)
Simiskina phalia (Hewitson, 1874)
Simiskina pharyge (Hewitson, 1874)
Simiskina pheretia (Hewitson, 1874)
Simiskina philura (H. H. Druce, 1895)
Simiskina proxima de Nicéville, 1895
Simiskina sibatika Eliot, 1969

References 
, 1940. A revision of the Malayan species of Poritiinae (Lepidoptera: Lycaenidae). Transactions of the Royal Entomological Society of London. 90: 337–350, 1 pl., 21 figs.
, 1886. Descriptions of new species and a new genus of Rhopalocera from the Malay Peninsula. Entomologist 19:11-12.
, 1969. More revisional notes on oriental butterflies. Entomologist 102: 269–278, 8 figs., 1 pl.
, 1992. In Corbet & Pendlebury, The Butterflies of the Malay Peninsula. 4th Edn. Kuala Lumpur.

, 1991. Butterflies of Borneo Vol. 2, No. 1. Lycaenidae. Tobishima Corporation, Tokyo.

, 1995. Checklist of the butterflies of the Philippine Islands (Lepidoptera: Rhopalocera) Nachrichten des Entomologischen Vereins Apollo Suppl. 14: 7–118.

External links

 
Poritiinae
Lycaenidae genera
Taxa named by William Lucas Distant